Dick and Dom (originally Richard and Dominic) are a British comedy double act consisting of the presenters Richard "Dick" McCourt and Dominic "Dom" Wood. They are primarily known for presenting 'the broom cupboard' presentation links on Children's BBC in the 1990s and early 2000s, before moving onto the double BAFTA Award winning Dick & Dom in da Bungalow, a children's entertainment show that was broadcast live during weekend mornings on BBC One, CBBC and later BBC Two. The show ran for five series between 2002 and 2006.

Filmography

Television

Film

Radio/Podcasts

Theatre/Festivals/DJ gigs 

Since 2005, the duo have been doing DJ sets at Students' unions in Universities all over the UK. They now DJ at all major festivals.

Dick vs Dom also known as 'Dick and Dom LIVE' is a live 60-minute gameshow which involves the whole audience. The stage show originated at Butlins where they headlined with Dick vs Dom in 2014 and 2016. The show has also toured UK theatres and Family Festivals.

In 2016 it was announced via Dick and Dom's official Twitter account that Dick vs Dom will go on its first full UK tour in 2017 The tour began on 10 April 2017 and ended on 29 October 2017, running for 22 shows. On 19 September 2017, it was confirmed that 'Dick & Dom's Circus Showdown' a new show to Butlins would launch in May and October half terms 2018. In 2018 they took Dick vs Dom to the Edinburgh Festival as part of Underbelly and received five-star reviews. In May 2019 they performed Dick vs Dom at the Eden Project in Cornwall and onboard P&O Cruises. They have also launched their new festival show Dick vs Dom DJ Battle.

They have appeared at many festivals including Camp Bestival, The Big Festival, Kendal Calling, CarFest, Jimmy's Festival, Chalfest, Wychwood, Standon Calling, Hay Festival and BST in Hyde Park. At festivals they have performed Dick vs Dom, hosted the main stage and most recently DJ with their new spin off show Dick vs Dom DJ Battle.

Tour overview

Awards and nominations

References

External links 
 Absolute Genius with Dick and Dom

British children's television presenters
English comedy duos
English television presenters
Entertainer duos